Khamgaon Lok Sabha constituency was a Lok Sabha (Parliamentary) constituency of Maharashtra state in western India. This constituency was in existence during Lok Sabha elections of 1962, 1967 and 1971 for the 3rd to 5th Lok Sabha. It was abolished for 1977 Lok Sabha elections, with creation of new Washim (Lok Sabha constituency) in neighbouring Akola district. It was reserved for Scheduled Caste candidate.

Members of the Parliament

1952-61: Constituency does not exist
1962: Laxman Shrawan Bhatkar, Indian National Congress (as Khamgaon (SC) ( Constituency no 28 of Maharashtra State ) )
1967: Arjun Kasture, Indian National Congress (as Khamgaon (SC) ( Constituency no 17 of Maharashtra State ) )
1971: Arjun Kasture, Indian National Congress (as Khamgaon(SC) ( Constituency no 17 of Maharashtra State ) )
1976 onwards: Constituency does not exist

See Washim (Lok Sabha constituency)

See also
 Buldhana (Lok Sabha constituency)
 Akola (Lok Sabha constituency)
 Washim (Lok Sabha constituency)
 List of former constituencies of the Lok Sabha
 Buldhana district
 Akola district

References

Former Lok Sabha constituencies of Maharashtra
1977 disestablishments in India
Constituencies disestablished in 1977
1962 establishments in Maharashtra
Former constituencies of the Lok Sabha